Mukhinsky is a rural locality (a settlement) and the administrative center of Mukhinsky Selsoviet of Oktyabrsky District, Amur Oblast, Russia. The population was 572 as of 2018. There are 9 streets.

Geography 
Mukhinsky is located 39 km southwest of Yekaterinoslavka (the district's administrative centre) by road. Cheryomushki is the nearest rural locality.

References 

Rural localities in Oktyabrsky District, Amur Oblast